Marco Antonio Verni Lippi (born 27 February 1976, in Santiago) is a Chilean shot putter. His personal best throw is 21.14 metres, achieved in July 2004 in Santiago.

Biography
He is a multiple South American champion, finished eleventh at the 2001 Summer Universiade and won the silver medal at the 2003 Pan American Games. He also competed at the World Championships in 2001, 2003, 2005 and 2007, the Olympic Games in 2004 and 2008 as well as the 2004 World Indoor Championships without reaching the final.

Verni held the South American Record with 21,14 metres until 2013.

Competition record

References

External links

1976 births
Living people
Sportspeople from Santiago
Chilean male shot putters
Athletes (track and field) at the 1999 Pan American Games
Athletes (track and field) at the 2003 Pan American Games
Athletes (track and field) at the 2007 Pan American Games
Athletes (track and field) at the 2004 Summer Olympics
Athletes (track and field) at the 2008 Summer Olympics
Olympic athletes of Chile
Chilean people of Italian descent
Pan American Games silver medalists for Chile
Pan American Games medalists in athletics (track and field)
South American Games gold medalists for Chile
South American Games silver medalists for Chile
South American Games medalists in athletics
Competitors at the 1998 South American Games
Medalists at the 2003 Pan American Games
21st-century Chilean people